"Woman" is a song by Swedish singer-songwriter Neneh Cherry from her third studio album, Man (1996). Written by Cherry, her husband Cameron McVey, and Jonathan Sharp, the song was created as a take on American singer James Brown's 1966 hit "It's a Man's Man's Man's World". The song's lyrics describe the difficulties women face in life, allowing Cherry to be seen as an empowering female recording artist.

Released on 22 July 1996, "Woman" became one of Cherry's biggest, though one of her last, hits in Europe and Australia, reaching the top 10 in Finland, Hungary, Iceland, the United Kingdom, and the Wallonia region of Belgium.

Critical reception
Ross Jones from The Guardian described it as an "awe-inspiring new work", adding that it "evoke" James Brown's "It's a Man's Man's World", while the singer "bawls her soul into the mic." Pan-European magazine Music & Media wrote that the song is Cherry's "own take" on the Brown song ("this is a woman's world/ it's my world"). "Even the melodies and chord changes sound the same, but this track obviously has a message: it's a tribute to femininity and its loving, caring power." Music Week rated it five out of five, picking it as Single of the Week. The reviewer declared it as "a gorgeous, heart-rending song in the vein of Trout and Manchild. Cherry at her best." Writing for NME, Dele Fadele noted that the singer's "forages into soul possess an irreverence that lift otherwise earnest pastiches", stating that "Woman" rewrites Brown's song as a "feminist tract". British columnist James Masterton called "Woman" one of Cherry's best tracks up to that point, complimenting its mood and writing that it "beats the pants off anything she has released before".

Commercial performance
"Woman" was released as a single on 22 July 1996, becoming Cherry's last substantial hit. It reached number two in Iceland, number three in Walloon Belgium, number four in Finland and Hungary, and number nine on the UK Singles Chart. In her native Sweden, the song peaked at number 20 in its second week, spending 10 weeks on the Swedish Singles Chart. Elsewhere in Europe, the single reached the top 20 in Flemish Belgium, France, Norway and Switzerland. On the Eurochart Hot 100, it peaked at number 21 during its second week on the chart, after a debut at number 37. In Australasia, "Woman" was moderately successful, peaking at number 17 in Australia and number 35 in New Zealand. The song has received a Gold certification in France, denoting sales greater than 250,000.

Aftermath
After the success of "Woman", Cherry stated that she felt she was pushing her limits with the level of fame she was experiencing, claiming that the success she was receiving was enjoyable, but it was not completely what she wanted. She explained, "The idea behind making 'Buffalo Stance' and Raw Like Sushi wasn't to be famous, it was to change things and do things the way that we do them, always with an idea of activism or a kind of rebellion."

Track listings

European CD single
 "Woman" (Heavy Guitar mix)
 "Had You in Me"

European maxi-CD single; UK CD1; Australian CD single
 "Woman" – 4:37
 "Heart Throbs" – 3:49
 "Telephone Pole" (demo) – 4:57
 "Woman" (Heavy Guitar mix) – 4:39

UK CD2
 "Woman" (La Funk Mob mix)
 "Woman" (Alex Reece vocal mix)
 "Had You in Me"
 "Woman" (Alex Reece no vocal)

UK cassette single
 "Woman"
 "Heart Throbs"
 "Telephone Pole" (demo)

Charts and certifications

Weekly charts

Year-end charts

Certifications

In popular culture
In 2018 the song was used in a TV advertisement for L'Oréal Paris Voluminous Mascara.

References

1996 singles
1996 songs
English-language Swedish songs
Hut Records singles
Neneh Cherry songs
Song recordings produced by Cameron McVey
Song recordings produced by Jonny Dollar
Songs with feminist themes
Songs written by Cameron McVey
Songs written by Jonny Dollar
Songs written by Neneh Cherry
Soul songs